Sigma Phi Delta is an international professional-social fraternity of engineers. As "The Premier International Fraternity of Engineers", the organization is the only fraternity of its kind that draws its membership exclusively from male engineering students at ABET-accredited colleges and universities, as other similar organizations are co-ed or admit students not strictly in traditional engineering programs (such as architecture or technical sciences).

History
Sigma Phi Delta was founded at University of Southern California on April 11, 1924 and currently has 25 active chapters.

Symbols

Blazon for the Sigma Phi Delta Coat of Arms

Gules, a pall or, between, in chief two retorts crossed argent, in dexter base a quill sable surmounting a key in saltire, of the third, in sinister base a hammer fesswise of the fourth debruising a compass, points downward, of the third; over all the escutcheon of pretense, azure, charged with a castle or, masoned sable, with a bordure argent.

Crest, over a duke's helmet and a torse of the colors, a dexter cubit arm, proper, grasping a thunderbolt, winged or
Mantling: Gules doubled, or
Supporters: Two lions, rampant, proper

Motto: Sigma Phi Delta, in upper and lower case Greek letters

Insignia
The Name of the Fraternity is represented by the capital form of the Greek letters Sigma (Σ), Phi (Φ), Delta (Δ) which stand for Science, Friendship and Duty.

Pledge Pin
The Pledge Pin is described as: "A red triangular background on which is a black Castle, the whole bordered in gold".

Membership Badge
The Membership Badge is described as: "A triangle having concave corners on which are superimposed three smaller triangles having concave sides and having their vertices at the center of the badge on which is placed a ruby. The smaller triangles, which contain the letters Sigma, Phi and Delta, are black, the background between them being white. A gold star is located near each of the vertices of the large triangle. The border may be engraved gold or may be jeweled. The crown pearl badge has four pearls on each side of the badge. The ruby point badge has two rubies and two pearls on each side, the pearls being in the middle and the rubies at the outside".

Fraternity flag

The fraternity flag is 4' × 6' cotton bunting or nylon. The design is black letters, bordered with white and a gold Castle on a red field. This is a standard flag, that is, read correctly from left to right on one side and in reverse on the other.

Strategic partnerships 
In 2015, Sigma Phi Delta and Alpha Omega Epsilon joined together to form a strategic partnership with the FIRST Robotics Competition in order to fulfill their respective mission to further Engineering Education. Together, they plan to advocate and promote career opportunities in STEM, within grades K–12 as well as higher education, build on existing STEM related programs, and seek ways to engage their memberships in FIRST Mentor/Coach opportunities as a means of workforce development, increased community involvement and/or encourage employees to give back to the communities where they live/work. Most Sigma Phi Delta chapters were already involved with their respective communities FIRST teams, but this further cements Sigma Phi Delta's object of further Engineering as a whole.

Chapters

Sigma Phi Delta notable alumni
 Eric Newell (Theta chapter) – Former Chairman and CEO of the oil company Syncrude. Chancellor of the University of Alberta.

See also

 Professional fraternities and sororities

References

 
Student organizations established in 1924
Professional fraternities and sororities in the United States
Student societies in the United States
Active former members of the North American Interfraternity Conference
Former members of Professional Fraternity Association
1924 establishments in California